Monchy & Alexandra were a bachata musical group from the Dominican Republic. They sang together as a duo in the period 1998 to 2008. Their discography consists of three studio albums, three compilation albums, two live albums and ten singles.

The duo released their debut studio effort  Hoja en Blanco in 1999. The album was rereleased in 2001, upon the success of the lead single and title track, which had made its way to number thirteen on the Billboard Tropical/Salsa Airplay chart. Confesiones, the duo's follow-up effort was released in 2002 and produced two top-ten singles on the Tropical/Salsa Airplay chart: "Te Quiero Igual Que Ayer" and "Dos Locos," with the former reaching the number two position. The album peaked at number eight and number two on the Billboard Top Latin Albums and  Billboard Tropical/Salsa Albums charts, respectively.

2003 saw the release of their first remix album, The Mix. It reached number fifty on the Top Latin Albums chart and number five on the Tropical Albums chart. It featured one single, "Polos Opuesto" which reached the top ten of the Tropical/Salsa Airplay chart, peaking at number seven. 

Monchy & Alexandra's final studio album, Hasta El Fin (2004) became their first album to enter the Billboard 200 when it entered at number 192. It peaked at number seven on the Top Latin Albums chart, giving the duo their first number-one album on the Tropical/Salsa Albums chart. It produced two singles, "Perdidos" and "Hasta El Fin," both of which made it to the top five of the Tropical/Salsa Airplay chart. "Perdidos" lead the chart for seven weeks in 2004, while leading for another eight weeks in 2005. It became their first single to enter the Billboard Hot 100, peaking at number ninety-two. It also reached the number three position on the Billboard Hot Latin Songs chart.

In 2006, the duo released a greatest hits compilation, Éxitos y Más. The album entered the Billboard 200 at number 181, peaking within the top ten of both the Top Latin Albums and Tropical Albums charts. "No Es Una Novela" was released as single for the album, giving the duo their second number-one on the Tropical Songs chart. 

In 2019, Monchy & Alexandra appeared as featured artists on American singer Romeo Santos' fourth studio album Utopia.

Albums

Studio albums

Compilation albums

Live albums

Singles

As lead artists

As featured artists

Album appearances

Notes

References

Tropical music discographies
Discographies of Dominican Republic artists